Kim Heungsou (Hangul: 김흥수; Hanja: 金興洙; November 17, 1919 – June 9, 2014) was a Korean painter who was sometimes called the "Picasso of Korea". Jang soo hyun, his partner and executive curator of Kim Heungsou museum died of ovarian cancer in November 2012.

Biography 
Born in Hamheung in Korea under Japanese rule, he graduated from Tokyo Art school (東京美術學校). After the independence of the Korean Peninsula, he sat as deputy of Seoul Art high school and lecturer in Seoul National University.

In 1955, he studied painting in Paris, and his works were submitted to Salon d'Automne. Thereafter, he initiated an individual art showcase and held exhibitions several times, starting from Paris, gained access to the European market. He held exhibitions around the world, including in France and Russia. His works have been featured at international auctions.

After coming back to Seoul, Heungsou was appointed to the panel of judges for the 10th Korea grand art convention and presented his works in 1961. Six years later, he went as an exchange professor to Pennsylvania Academy of Fine Arts from 1968 to 1980, which allowed him to release his pieces of sculpture, holding series of travelling exhibitions from coast to coast. American-Korean foundation served his work from the beginning.

Heungsou died on 9 June 2014 at the age of 94.

Works  
Heungsou's works largest body of work is the so-called harmonism paintings, collaborating structures and abstract forms in a piece of art work. The genesis for his idea came from the harmony of yin and yang, between female and male and between the east and the west.

According to an interview with Ftnews Korea, he was enormously influenced by the idea of Mikhail Gorbachev mixing the philosophy of the east and the west, invited by Pushkin Museum. After studying Cubism, he became more immersed in paintings. In 1960, he could sell out all his works entered into the exhibition in Paris and later gained the title of salon, which he said Japanese counterpart had never achieved the registration as a member at the moment.

His works have roots in Harmonism, which is derived from the mixture of abstract paintings and forms/structures. In 1967, he observed the flow of American abstract paintings, which enabled him to try new challenges such as harmonizing abstract paintings with other forms.

Rooted in Mozaic, he realized the partition of hues within his works, which featured in Korean customs and arts with erotic subject matters. His works are departed from his philosophy originated from Korean peninsula. In this sense, his drawings are famous for its fabulous collaboration of hues and shapes.

Korean media coverage says that 2010 exhibition in Seoul was the last chance to watch his creative arts work, owing to his deteriorized health but he continued to appear in exhibition: as a displaced citizen born in what would become North Korea, he presented his work called Lost Hometown (Hangul, 망향) commemorating the twentieth year of the joint entry of the two Koreas into the United Nations, held in the art hall of the National Assembly of South Korea.

See also

 Korean painting
 Korean sculpture
 Korean Art and Architecture
 Shin Saimdang
 Lim Yunjidang
 Park Indeok
 Kim Hwallan

References

External links
 두산백과(Doosan Encyclopedia) - 김흥수 (Kim Heungsou)
 두산백과(Doosan Encyclopedia) - 김흥수 미술관 (Kim Heungsoo art museum)

1919 births
2014 deaths
20th-century South Korean painters
Zainichi Korean people
21st-century painters
People from Hamhung
Pennsylvania Academy of the Fine Arts faculty